Marcinowice  is a village in Świdnica County, Lower Silesian Voivodeship, in south-western Poland. It is the seat of the administrative district (gmina) called Gmina Marcinowice.

References

Villages in Świdnica County